Richard Palmer is an entrepreneur and the founder of the company D3O Lab.

In 1999,  Palmer founded an innovation consultancy after studying at the Royal College of Art, working with clients such as Herman Miller and Levi's. Palmer's office/studio design won the Times & Gestetner Digital Office Award, competing against entrants such as Ted Baker and Sainsbury's. During this time, Palmer invented a new protective garment material since branded as D3O. The company received government funding to develop military hardware and has since won the o2 and Arena Magazine Entrepreneur of the Year award. Palmer was nominated for the European Inventor Award 2019 https://www.epo.org/learning-events/european-inventor/finalists/2019/palmer.html

Sources
d3o Official Site 
Interview with Richard Palmer
What's the story? website

References

External links

http://ideasuploaded.com/interview-with-richard-palmer-inventor-of-d30-an-impact-protection-material/

Living people
Year of birth missing (living people)